Muchu is a village in Namkha rural municipality in Humla District in the Karnali Province of north-western Nepal. Previously Muchu was a separate Village Development Committee which merged with other neighbouring villages and restructured as Namkha rural council. Muchu was thus divided into two wards (ward no. 4 & 5).  At the time of the 1991 Nepal census it had a population of 917 persons living in 164 individual households. and at the time of 2011 Nepal census it had 916 individuals.

References

External links
 UN map of the municipalities of Dolpa District
Ministry of Federal Affairs and General Administration
MOFAGA GIS MAP

Populated places in Humla District